The Crown Assets Distribution (CAD) handles moveable Crown assets that a federal department or agency has declared as surplus, under the Surplus Crown Assets Act (R.S., c. S-20, s. 1.) At some time in the recent past, the organization was renamed GC Surplus.

The Public Works and Government Services Canada (PWGSC) operates nine Crown Assets Distribution Centres (CADC) located across the country which manage the disposal of moveable federal government surplus material. Acting as the Government of Canada's agent, PWGSC provides client departments with a disposal service through direct sales or through the management of contracts with service providers.

History

In 1944, the Government of Canada created the War Assets Corporation, which was subsequently renamed the Crown Assets Disposal Corporation. In 1984, the activities and staff of the Corporation were integrated into the Department of Supply and Services. The organization became known as the Crown Assets Distribution Service Line and has continued its functions within PWGSC.

Its mandate is to manage the surplus moveable assets disposal program for the government, providing quality service to clients while obtaining best value for the Crown. The legislative base for its operations is the Surplus Crown Assets Act along with the Treasury Board Policy on the Disposal of Surplus Moveable Crown Assets. With a few exceptions, the legislation and policy require PWGSC to manage the disposal of surplus assets on behalf of federal organizations. The Act was amended in 1993 to provide departments with additional options for the disposal of surplus moveable assets, subject to terms and conditions to be prescribed by the Treasury Board of Canada.

For over 60 years, CADCs have been involved in the direct sale of surplus materiel ranging from ships and cars to furniture and clothing, as well as seized goods on behalf of federal government departments and agencies. Surplus assets are sold directly by CADCs or through contracted service providers. Many assets are sold through public sales that attract thousands of buyers, and, in some cases, sales are conducted at CADC warehouses located in Montreal, Halifax and Ottawa.

Many transactions also take place through the GC Surplus website, where each item is listed and described, often accompanied by a photo. The RFP/RFI process to let the contract was released to public view in June 2013, while Rona Ambrose was Minister of PWGSC. The site received over 50,000 visitors per month.

CADCs also act as agents for foreign governments in the sale of their surplus assets located in Canada and have working arrangements with certain European governments for disposal of Canadian military surplus located in their countries.

The process

Departments or federal bodies notify CAD of their surplus assets by filling out a Report of Surplus form and sending it to the nearest CADC. CAD then handles all aspects of asset disposal from start to finish.

The process can include: organizing sales of assets; arranging for viewing of assets; conducting sales; evaluating bids; receiving money; handling all sales-related inquiries; and returning net proceeds to clients.

Once the item is sold, the client receives the net proceeds from the sale and a transaction report.

Agencies which sells government surplus

 Nine CADCs across Canada.
 Competitively selected private sector service providers.
 CADCs acting as agents for foreign governments seeking to dispose of their surplus items located in Canada.
 Agency agreements with service providers abroad.

How surplus is sold

 Public sales:
 advertised in the media, specifying details of location, commodities on sale and inspection times;
 goods are inspected on site;
 sealed bids are deposited in a secure bid box on site;
 after sale closing, offers are tabulated and the successful bidders are notified.
 Regular Sales:
 potential buyers registered with CAD receive electronic notification of the availability of assets of interest and may view assets for sale on the CAD web site and obtain an Offer to Purchase form;
 in some cases, Offers to Purchase are mailed out to interested bidders who have made their interest in specific commodities known to CAD;
 goods are available for inspection for a specified period as noted on the Offer to Purchase form;
 completed Offer to Purchase form must be returned to CAD by the specified closing date and time;
 after the closing date, sealed offers are opened and the successful bidders are notified.
 Sales through contracted service providers such as the National Master Standing Offer for vehicles and other contracts:
 contractors effect sales on behalf of clients.

Types of sales

 Vehicle Sales - conducted by service providers or through direct sales by CAD.
 Auctions - conducted by service providers.
 Regular Sales - through the Crown Assets Web site or through Offers to Purchase issued by mail.
 Public Sales - events conducted by CADCs at CADC or client sites open to the public.

Donations

Sometimes, government ministers can authorize "Gratuitous transfers" (donation) of valuable assets. This category consists of assets which have marketable value, but which are being donated to recipients which a custodian minister designates in order to meet specific or general program purposes of government. Some donations are pre-approved as part of an ongoing government program (e.g. the Computers for Schools Program). In all other cases, the donation must be approved by the minister through whom the department reports to Parliament. Gratuitous transfers should normally be carried out by an officer of the custodian department. Contractors should not normally be used.

See also

 Canada
 Government of Canada

References

External links
 Public Works and Government Services Canada
 Physical Asset Transfers to Crown and Other owned Corporations - TB Circular 1983-39
 Surplus Crown Assets Act
 Surplus Crown Assets Act
 USAF Gap Fillers, Labrador/Newfoundland - National Archives of Canada
 E100967 - CTS 1961 No. 7
 See what surplus items are for sale by the government, and bid on items

Government in Canada
Federal departments and agencies of Canada